Hayato Sumino (born 14 July 1995) is a Japanese pianist and composer known for his performances of music by Frédéric Chopin.

Born in Tokyo, he started playing the piano at age 3. He studied science and engineering at the University of Tokyo's Graduate School of Information Science and Technology, graduating in March 2020 with a master's degree and the President's Award. He also studied music information processing technology and artificial intelligence for six months at the French Institute for Research and Coordination in Acoustics/Music.

In August 2018, he won the Grand Prix at the 42nd PTNA Piano Competition, a Japanese piano competition. In July 2019 he won third prize at the Lyon International Piano Competition.

In 2021, Sumino participated in the XVIII International Chopin Piano Competition in Warsaw, in which he advanced to the third round (the semifinal). His live performance in the second round attracted 45,000 online viewers, setting a record for the competition. Before the competition, he had studied intensively online (due to the COVID-19 pandemic) with Jean-Marc Luisada.

Sumino is also a YouTuber by the name of "Cateen", with over 1m subscribers as of 2022.

He is a Steinway artist.

Recordings

 Passion (2019, Warner Music)
 HAYATOSM (2020)

Compositions
 Big Cat Waltz (2020)
 Tinkerland (2020)
 Piano Sonata No. 0 "SOUMEI" (2020)
 Cadenza to Liszt's Hungarian Rhapsody No. 2 (2020)
 One Minute Hourglass (2021)
 New Birth (2022)

Concerts
 French Piano Series (2022) with Jean-Marc Luisada and Congyu Wang

References

External links
Official website
YouTube channel

1995 births
21st-century classical pianists
21st-century Japanese pianists
Japanese male classical pianists
Japanese classical pianists
Living people